Greer Mill, also known as Greer Roller Mill, is a historic grist mill located near Alton, Oregon County, Missouri. It was built in 1899, and is a 2 1/2-story, rectangular, frame mill building on a sandstone foundation.  It has a side gable roof topped by a cupola.  The mill operated until 1920.  Conservationist Leo Drey purchased the property in 1987, and later sold it to the Forest Service for incorporation into the Eleven Point District of the Mark Twain National Forest.

It was listed on the National Register of Historic Places in 2005.

References

Grinding mills on the National Register of Historic Places in Missouri
Industrial buildings completed in 1899
Buildings and structures in Oregon County, Missouri
National Register of Historic Places in Oregon County, Missouri